Adobe Flores is a historic house in South Pasadena, California, U.S. It was built on Rancho San Pascual from 1838 to 1845. It was named for José María Flores. It was restored by architect Carleton Winslow in 1919. It has been listed on the National Register of Historic Places since June 18, 1973.

Gallery

References 

Houses on the National Register of Historic Places in California
Houses completed in 1846
Houses in Los Angeles County, California
South Pasadena, California